Thomas Best (1589 – c. 1649), of Middleton Quernhow, near Ripon, Yorkshire and Fleet Street, London, was an English politician.

He was a Member (MP) of the Parliament of England for Ripon in 1626.

References

1589 births
1649 deaths
People from the City of London
English MPs 1626
People from Ripon